Joseph Victor Adamec (August 13, 1935 – March 20, 2019) was an American prelate of the Roman Catholic Church who served as bishop of the Diocese of Altoona-Johnstown, Pennsylvania from 1987 to 2011. 

On March 1, 2016, Pennsylvania Attorney General Kathleen Kane implied that as bishop, Adamec led a major cover-up scandal involving the sexual assault of hundreds of children by Diocese of Altoona-Johnstown priests.

Biography

Early life 
Joseph Adamec was born on August 13, 1935, in Bannister, Michigan, the son of Michal August Adamec and Alzbeta Eva Ochran Adamec. He attended Michigan State University from 1953 to 1955, and studied for the priesthood at the Pontifical Nepomucene College in Rome.

Priesthood 
Adamec was ordained by Cardinal Luigi Traglia in the Church of St. Anselm in Rome on July 3, 1960, for the Diocese of Nitra in Slovakia (the former diocese of his parents). He earned a Licentiate in Sacred Theology at the Pontifical Lateran University in 1961. 

Adamec returned to serve the Diocese of Saginaw, Michigan, where he served in numerous capacities, including secretary of the bishop and master of ceremonies, ecclesiastical notary, and chancellor of the diocese. In 1980 he received the "Pro Ecclesia et Pontifice" medal which recognized service to the Catholic Church and pope. In 1985, Adamec was named a prelate of honor. Adamec also served as the national president of the Slovak Catholic Federation, a position he was elected to in 1971 and held for seventeen years.

Bishop of Altoona-Johnstown 
On March 12, 1987, Adamec was named the bishop of the Altoona-Johnstown Diocese. He was consecrated on May 20, 1987, in the Cathedral of the Most Blessed Sacrament by Jozef Cardinal Tomko.

His retirement and the appointment of his successor were announced on January 14, 2011. Mark Leonard Bartchak, of the Diocese of Erie, Pennsylvania, was named his successor.

Joseph Adamec died in Hollidaysburg, Pennsylvania, on March 20, 2019 at age 83.

See also

 Catholic Church hierarchy
 Catholic Church in the United States
 Historical list of the Catholic bishops of the United States
 List of Catholic bishops of the United States
 Lists of patriarchs, archbishops, and bishops

References

External links

Episcopal succession

20th-century Roman Catholic bishops in the United States
People from Gratiot County, Michigan
Michigan State University alumni
American people of Slovak descent
1935 births
2019 deaths
Pontifical Lateran University alumni
Catholics from Michigan
21st-century Roman Catholic bishops in the United States